NX1 may refer to:

Samsung NX1, camera
Neverwinter Nights 2: Mask of the Betrayer, game